Burlington is a home rule municipality and the county seat and most populous community of Kit Carson County, Colorado, United States.  The city population was 3,172 at the 2020 United States Census.

History
Burlington was originally laid out one mile west of its present location in 1887 by a man named Lowell in anticipation of the arrival of the railroad. In addition to having the location wrong, Lowell also did not have title to the land. When the railroad did arrive, the Chicago, Rock Island and Pacific Railroad, it built its depot at the present site of Burlington and those who had built in Old Burlington moved their buildings to the new townsite. Trains began running in 1888. "The Settlement", about 12 miles northwest of Burlington, was settled by German immigrants from Russia, many from Hoffnungstal, South Russia, who, in addition to their homesteads, built Congregational and Lutheran churches.

Geography
Burlington is located at  (39.304293, -102.268683) on the High Plains in eastern Colorado.

The easternmost interchange in Colorado on Interstate 70 is located at Burlington.

Climate
Burlington has a typical High Plains cool semi-arid climate with hot, dry summers punctuated by occasional heavy thunderstorm rains, and cold, very dry winters. Snowfall is occasionally heavy – the 1971 to 2000 mean was  – but mostly the winter weather is very dry and extremely variable in temperatures. More than 33 afternoons (over a third) each winter can be expected to reach or exceed , but 6.5 mornings each year will drop to or under  and 24.6 afternoons do not top freezing.

Demographics

As of the census of 2010, there were 4,191 people, 1,478 households, and ? families residing in the city. The racial makeup of the city was 84.3% White, 6.2% African American, 1.2% Native American, 0.5% Asian, 0.1% Pacific Islander, 8.5% from other races, and 0.90% from two or more races. Hispanic or Latino of any race were 27.5% of the population.

There were 1,287 households, out of which 32.9% had children under the age of 18 living with them, 53.0% were married couples living together, 8.6% had a female householder with no husband present, and 34.7% were non-families. 30.3% of all households were made up of individuals, and 13.9% had someone living alone who was 65 years of age or older.  The average household size was 2.47 and the average family size was 3.11.

In the city, the population was spread out, with 25.2% under the age of 18, 8.6% from 18 to 24, 32.8% from 25 to 44, 19.7% from 45 to 64, and 13.7% who were 65 years of age or older.  The median age was 36 years. For every 100 females, there were 121.6 males.  For every 100 females age 18 and over, there were 126.2 males.

The median income for a household in the city was $33,854, and the median income for a family was $42,500. Males had a median income of $29,167 versus $19,018 for females. The per capita income for the city was $16,054.  About 12.2% of families and 14.8% of the population were below the poverty line, including 20.3% of those under age 18 and 15.8% of those age 65 or over.

Government
Burlington is a home rule municipality.

Education

Burlington Public Schools are part of the Burlington Public School District RE-6J. The district has one elementary school, one middle school and one high school. Burlington also has several private schools.

Burlington Elementary School, Burlington Middle School and Burlington High School are located in Burlington.

Media

Print
Burlington has a weekly newspaper, The Burlington Record. A run of 3 years, 1910–1912, of the Kit Carson County Record is archived in the Colorado Historic Newspapers Collection.

Radio
The following radio stations are licensed to Burlington:

AM

FM

National Historic Landmark
Kit Carson County Carousel (National Historic Landmark)

Notable people
Notable individuals who were born in or have lived in Burlington include:
 Mark Hillman (1967- ), Colorado state legislator
 Robert P. Kerr (1892-1960), film director, actor, screenwriter
 Mike Lounge (1946-2011), engineer, astronaut
 Beau McCoy (1980- ), Nebraska state legislator
 Susan Phillips (1949- ), Missouri state legislator

See also

Colorado
Bibliography of Colorado
Index of Colorado-related articles
Outline of Colorado
List of counties in Colorado
List of municipalities in Colorado
List of places in Colorado
Philadelphia Toboggan Company Carousel 12

References

External links

City of Burlington website
CDOT map of the City of Burlington
The Early Days of Burlington (PDF)

Cities in Kit Carson County, Colorado
Cities in Colorado
County seats in Colorado
German-Russian culture in Colorado
Populated places established in 1887
1887 establishments in Colorado